Talpa is a genus in the mole family Talpidae.  Among the first taxa in science, Carolus Linnaeus used the Latin word for "moles", talpa, in his Regnum Animale to refer to the commonly known European form of mole.  The group has since been expanded to include 13 extant species, found primarily in Europe and western Asia.  The European mole, found throughout most of Europe, is a member of this genus, as are several species restricted to small ranges. One species, Père David's mole, is data deficient.  These moles eat earthworms, insects, and other invertebrates found in the soil.

The females of this genus have rudimentary male features such as Cowper's glands and a two-lobed prostate. A group of scientists has suggested that they are true hermaphrodites; however, others state that they are fully functional females.

There are 13 species in this genus:

 Altai mole, T. altaica
 Aquitanian mole, T. aquitania
 Blind mole, T. caeca
 Caucasian mole, T. caucasica
 Père David's mole, T. davidiana
 European mole, T. europaea
 Levant mole, T. levantis
 Martino's mole, T. martinorum
 Spanish mole, T. occidentalis
 Ognev's mole, T. ognevi
 Roman mole, T. romana
 Balkan mole, T. stankovici
 Talysch mole, T. talyschensis

In addition, one extinct species is known from fossil remains: the Tyrrhenian mole (Talpa tyrrhenica) from the Pleistocene of Corsica and Sardinia.

The current phylogeny of the species in the genus is shown below:

References

External links

Talpa
Mammal genera
Taxa named by Carl Linnaeus